Zayd ibn Arqam (Arabic: زيد بن أرقم) was a Sahabi ("Companion") of the Islamic prophet Muhammad. He was from the tribe of Khazraj and a senior Companion from the Ansar "Helpers" in Madina, he attended 17 campaigns with Muhammad and died in 66 Hijri

 
He was the first person in Islam to give his home for the first Salat (ritual prayer) in Islam, which was led by Muhammad. He gave allegiance to Abu Bakr.

After the Invasion of Banu Mustaliq 'Abdullāh ibn ‘Ubayy, who was referred to as the head of the "Hypocrites" (munāfiqūn), was furious for the challenge which the Muslims showed towards the hostile plans and intrigues woven behind closed doors, and swore "the most honourable will expel the meanest out of Madinah," and added: "They (the Muslims) have outnumbered and shared us our land. If you fatten your dog, it will eat you." Zayd ibn Arqam narrated this to Muhammad who then asked for Abdullāh ibn ‘Ubayy's presence. ibn ‘Ubayy swore oaths denying he had stated something like this and because of this he was let go. But later on the testimony of Zayd ibn Arqam was verified by the revelation of Surah Al-Munāfiqūn.

References

Companions of the Prophet